Join the Club is a Filipino alternative rock band formed in 2001, known for their hits such as "Nobela", "Paano Sasabihin" and "Lunes". The band currently consists of Biboy Renia, Congie Lulu, Migs Mendoza, and Mark Garchitorena. Notable former member include Aris Manjares. According to them, Join The Club is not just a band, but a revolution.

Personnel
Current members
 Biboy Renia – lead vocals, acoustic guitar

 Migs Mendoza – lead guitar, keyboard synthesizer, backing vocals
 Congie Lulu – Bass Guitars, B.Vocals
 Mark Garchitorena – drums

Early members
 Aris Manjares†  – rhythm guitar
 Paolo Santiago – drums

Influences
The band's influences include Dong Abay, YANO, The Beatles, Motion City Soundtrack, Sean Lennon, Black Rebel Motorcycle Club, Eraserheads, All American Rejects, Bob Dylan, Travoltas, Alfie, The Killers, The Strokes, Clash, Ramones, Daniel Johnston, Limbeck, Joy Division and My Vitriol.

Discography

EPs, Rarities, Unreleased Works
 Join The Club LIVE DEMO (Independent) (2002)
 Join The Club EP  (Hello Sunrise Records, Independent) (2003)
 Gerista EP (Hello Sunrise Records, Independent) (2009)
 Kulang EP (Hello Sunrise Records, Independent, Unreleased) (2010)
 Nobela NAKED Vol. 1 (Hello Sunrise Records, Independent, Unreleased) (2010)
 Makapili Sessions Vol. 1 (Online) (2011)
 Nahihibang EP (Hello Sunrise Records, Independent) (2014)
 Langit 'Pag Kapiling Ka EP (Hello Sunrise Records, Independent,  Unreleased) (2015)
 Makapili Sessions Vol. 1 (Hello Sunrise Records, Independent) (2014)
 Makapili Sessions Vol. 2 (Hello Sunrise Records, Independent) (2014)
 Gintong Nadarang Sa Apoy EP (Independent) (Unreleased) (TBA, 2017)

Studio albums
Nobela (Warner Music Philippines and Redrum Music) (2005)
 Nobela "Repackaged" (Warner Music Philippines and Redrum Music) (2007)
Gera Ng Balarila (Universal Records, Twice To Beat Management and Hello Sunrise Records) (2013)
Strangely Familiar (Hello Sunrise Records, Unreleased) (2016)
Untitled Album (Hello Sunrise Records, TBA) (2020)

Compilation albums
Full Volume (Sony Music) (2003)
The Best of Manila Sound: Hopia Mani Popcorn (Viva Records) (2006)
Enveloped Ideas (MCA Music) (2003)

Singles

Join the Club EP
 Mahiwaga (2003)

Nobela
 Lunes (2005)
 Nobela (2005)
 Tinig (2006)

Nobela (Repackaged)
 Tinig - Acoustic (2006)
 Paano Sasabihin (2006)
 Dekada (Nakalimutan Ko Na Bang Magmahal) (2007)

The Best of Manila Sound: Hopia Mani Popcorn
 Handog (2006)

Gerista EP
 Bagong Panimula (2009)
 Baliktanaw (2011)

Enveloped Ideas
 I Saw You Coming In (2011)

Gera Ng Balarila
 Bagong Panimula (2013)
 Balewalang Pag-Ibig (2013)
 Rakista (2013)

Nahihibang EP
 Nahihibang (2014)

Strangely Familiar (Unreleased)
 Pagsilang (2015)
 Kahit Sa Panaginip Na Lang (2016)
 Miserable (2017)

(Untitled Album)
 Mas Miserable (2019)
 Langit 'Pag Kapiling Ka feat. Jana Garcia (2019)
 Gintong Nadarang Sa Apoy (2020)
 Solitaryo (2020)

Music videos
 Lunes - Directed by Francis M (2004) 
 Nobela - Directed by Genghis Jimenez (2005)
 Tinig - (2006)
 Tinig Acoustic - Directed by Treb Monteras (2006)
 Paano Sasabihin - Directed by Treb Monteras (2007)
 Dekada - Directed by Genghis Jimenez (2007)
 Baliktanaw - Directed by Biboy Renia (2011)
 Bagong Panimula - Directed by Kevin Dayrit (2013)
 Balewalang Pag-ibig - Directed by Kevin Dayrit (2013)
 Rakista - Directed by Kevin Dayrit (2014)
 Nahihibang - Directed by Migs Mendoza, Mark Tumala, Jep Tumala (2014)
 Ang Pagsilang - Directed by Migs Mendoza (2015)
 Kahit Sa Panaginip Na Lang - Directed by Kevin Dayrit (2015)
 Miserable - Directed by Migs Mendoza, Mark Tumala, Jep Tumala (2017) (Unreleased)
 Mas Miserable - Directed by Migs Mendoza, Biboy Renia (2019)
 Langit 'Pag Kapiling Ka feat. Jana Garcia - Directed by Doms Lim (2019)
 Gintong Nadarang Sa Apoy - Directed by Migs Mendoza, Biboy Renia (2020)

Awards and nominations

References

Filipino alternative rock groups
Musical groups from Metro Manila
Musical groups established in 2001